The National Limousine Association (NLA) is a voluntary, non-profit, tax-exempt organization founded in 1985, dedicated to representing and furthering the worldwide, national, state and local interests of the luxury chauffeured ground transportation industry. NLA's members include limousine owners and operators, suppliers, manufacturers, and regional and state limousine associations.

Kyle Hammerschmidt, CAE is the association's executive director since May 2019.

The NLA is an official partner of UNICEF USA.

Ride Responsibly 
Ride Responsibly is an initiative started in February 2015 by the NLA to inform the public in an effort to ensure safer ground transportation. The campaign aims to bridge an industry-wide gap between the rights of passengers and the responsibility of service providers. The campaign establishes best safety practices for prearranged car services and transportation network companies (TNCs), which include ride-hailing app car services.

History 
 1985: The National Limousine Association is incorporated on March 15.
 1987: NLA hires Wayne Smith & Company as its first management company.
 1989: NLA and LCT Magazine agree to co-manage an industry trade show.
 1991: NLA and LCT sign first formal written agreement to co-manage trade show and share profits.
 1997: The "NLA Charity Fund" changes to the "Harold Berkman Memorial Fund" after a vote from the NLA Board.
 1998: Wayne Smith and Company is sold to Host Communications who assumes management role of the NLA.
 2001: Bobit Business Media is hired as the management company of the NLA. At this time, the NLA has 500 members and $70,000 in assets.
 2011: The NLA reaches over 2,000 members and $1,000,000 in assets.
 2014: The NLA Board unanimously approves the hiring of EVINS Communications, the NLA's public relations firm.

Board of Directors

Committees

References

Trade associations based in the United States
Limousines
Organizations established in 1985
1985 establishments in the United States